John William Pitt Kīnaʻu (December 21/27, 1842 – September 9, 1859) was a prince of the Kingdom of Hawaii and the only surviving son of High Chief William Pitt Leleiohoku I and Ruth Keʻelikōlani. As a descendant of King Kamehameha I, he was chosen to attend the Chiefs' Children's School (later renamed Royal School) taught by the American missionary Amos Starr Cooke and his wife, Juliette Montague Cooke, alongside fifteen of his royal cousins. At a young age, he inherited the landholdings of his father and his adoptive grandfather including Huliheʻe Palace, but the prince died under mysterious circumstances before his seventeenth birthday.

Early life and family
Kīnaʻu was born December 21/27, 1842, Honolulu, on the island of Oahu. His father was High Chief William Pitt Leleiohoku I (1821–1848) and his mother was High Ruth Keʻelikōlani (1826–1883). Through his mother he was Kamehameha I's great-great-grandchild. His mother's parentage was disputed, but she was a member of the House of Kamehameha through her own mother Pauahi. His recognized maternal grandmother was Kekūanāoʻa, who was the Governor of Oahu. Through his father, he descended from King Kekaulike of Maui. His father was the biological son of Prime Minister Kalanimoku, who was called The Iron Cable of Hawaii because of his political savvy and military prowess. His name "William Pitt", shared by his father and grandfather, was originally chosen by Kalanimoku in honor of Prime Minister William Pitt of England.
His Hawaiian name Kīnaʻu was given in honor of the Kuhina Nui, Kīnaʻu, Keʻelikōlani's stepmother and childhood guardian. She in turn was named after High Chief Kahōʻanokū Kīnaʻu.
He had an unnamed younger brother who died in infancy.
During his infancy, he was raised in a large hale pili (thatched house) named Auanakeo, which stood outside the Huliheʻe Palace, the principal residence of Leleiohoku's hānai (adoptive) father Kuakini, who was the Governor of Hawaii Island.

From 1842 until his death in 1844, Governor Kuakini served as a grandfather figure to the child. In 1928 Lucy Kaopaulu Peabody, a hapa-haole (part Caucasian) chiefess, recalled a scuffle between her and Kīnaʻu in their youth during a visit she and her grandmother paid to the Governor: 
One day when we were living at Kawaihae my grandmother went to Hulihee to see Kuakini, who was not well. I went with her and when Kinau saw me he chased me as he always did. I think he did not like me. I ran to my grandmother and she protected me. Kuakini saw me and said to my grandmother to let the haole go and told us to "hakaka" (fight). She did and we fought. I beat him. Kuakini made fun of Kinau who was about six years old then.

Education and career

Kīnaʻu entered the Chiefs' Children's School (later renamed the Royal School) on February 26, 1844, at the age of two as its sixteenth and last pupil.
He was the youngest with Victoria Kamāmalu and Lydia Kamakaʻeha, both being four years older. He was chosen by Kamehameha III to be eligible for the throne of the Kingdom of Hawaii. He was taught in English by American missionaries Amos Starr Cooke  and his wife, Juliette Montague Cooke, alongside his royal cousins. During their Sunday procession to church it was customary for boys and girls to walk side by side, Kīnaʻu would walk beside Lydia Kamakaʻeha, the future Queen Liliʻuokalani of Hawaii. In Liliʻuokalani's memoir, he is mentioned as John Kīnaʻu Pitt. 
The boarding school discontinued in 1850, and his family sent him to the day school (also called Royal School) ran by Reverend Edward G. Beckwith along with his former classmates Victoria Kamāmalu and Lydia Kamakaʻeha and new classmates Gideon Laʻanui, Nancy Sumner, Jane and Martha Swinton, and Mary Waterhouse. During his youth, the prince was often found on the parade ground of the old Honolulu Fort, instructing his friends while they were drilling as boy scouts. Kīnaʻu was considered to be a promising young man with an extremely bright mind and leadership qualities.

In January 1850, a correspondent of the American newspaper Rochester Democrat & Chronicle in Honolulu gave a description of the royal children and his impression of Kīnaʻu (the only he mentioned by name):

In 1848 his father died of measles, followed by his classmate Moses Kekūāiwa and Liliʻuokalani's sister Kaʻiminaʻauao. Leleiohoku, the sixth-largest landholder after the Great Mahele, had inherited the estates of his biological father Kalanimoku and his hānai (adoptive) father Kuakini, two of the most power chiefs in the kingdom. 
Leleiohoku had received thirty-six ʻāina (land parcels), mainly on the island of Hawaiʻi and Maui from King Kamehameha III. Thus after Leleiohoku's death, Kīnaʻu became the heir to all his father's property, including Huliheʻe Palace in Kailua-Kona. His ample inheritance made him one of the wealthiest people in the kingdom.
He was popularly called the "Prince of Kona" during his lifetime. On his sixteen birthday, the ambitious young prince asked his former classmate King Kamehameha IV to award him with all the lands whose names started with "Wai" (Hawaiian for "water") such as Waimea, Waianae, Waikapu, Wailuku, Waihee, Waialua, Waikane and so on, a request that the King refused.
After completing his education, Kīnaʻu served as aide-de-camp to King Kamehameha IV, and in his lifetime, he was considered "a very handsome young man".
Like his mother in later life, Kīnaʻu was often associated with supernatural power due to his royal rank. During a trip to the island of Hawaii in January 1859, his arrival on the island coincided with the eruption of Mauna Loa. It was reported that "it was believed by large proportion of the native population of the island, that Pele had thrown forth the lava stream in special honor of his arrival".

Death and burial

Kīnaʻu died on September 9, 1859, in Kapaʻau, Kohala district on the island of Hawaiʻi. The cause of his death was said to be an accident, although the details are unknown. An accusation of poisoning was forwarded by a noted priest and the whole of Kona became outraged over the rumors. One source claimed he was killed in a riding accident. While his obituary in the Hawaiian newspapers The Polynesian and The Pacific Commercial Advertiser claimed it was consumption.

Heartbroken over the loss of her husband and son, Keʻelikōlani kept his lead coffin in her house for weeks, with mourners chanting and reciting the traditional Hawaiian kanikau (poetic dirges) night and day.
On November 24, the remains of the prince were transported back to Oahu, on board the schooler Kaluna, for a proper burial suited for his rank. The state funeral procession occurred on December 27, and was attended by thousands of natives, foreign residents and visitors including the royal family and members of the government. Russian traveler Aleksei Vysheslavtsev, who arrived in Honolulu days before, latter wrote down a detail account of the events in Ocherki perom i karandashom, iz krugosvetnogo plavaniya (Sketches in Pen and Pencil from a Voyage around the World). A contradictory report by Scottish traveling performer John Henry Anderson described an earlier funeral service for the prince which was held at Kawaiahaʻo Church on Sunday, November 6. The funeral was estimated to have cost at least $10,000.

Initially buried in the Pohukaina Tomb, located on grounds of ʻIolani Palace, his remains were later transported along with those of his father's and other royals in a midnight torchlight procession on October 30, 1865, to the newly constructed Royal Mausoleum at Mauna ʻAla in the Nuʻuanu Valley. His mother's remain were also buried here after her death in 1883. In 1887, after the Mausoleum building became too crowded, the coffins belonging to members of the Kamehameha Dynasty including Kīnaʻu's were moved to the newly built Kamehameha Tomb. The name "W. P. Kinau" was inscribed on the mauka (mountainward) side of the monument above his final resting place.

Legacy
His landholdings and properties along with Huliheʻe Palace were inherited by his mother; beside his estates, Keʻelikōlani also inherited much of her son's debt. These lands along with subsequent inheritances that Keʻelikōlani would receive over her lifetime later became part of the Bernice Pauahi Bishop Estate which funds the Kamehameha Schools to this day.

Historian Albert Pierce Taylor, calling him by the name of "Liliulani", gave this posthumous description of the prince:
He was one of the most ambitious and promising of the young princes of the Kamehameha realm. It is believed by old Hawaiians today that had he lived he would have become a real and constructive leader of the Hawaiian people. He had a splendid physique and a magnetic personality. The glance of his eyes made him friends everywhere.

Notes

References

Bibliography

External links 

1842 births
1859 deaths
Princes of Hawaii
House of Kamehameha
Burials at the Royal Mausoleum (Mauna ʻAla)
Royal School (Hawaii) alumni